Silent Prey is the title of:
 Silent Prey (1992) a mystery book by John Sandford
 Silent Prey (1997) a direct-to-video film starring Carol Shaya